Goutai is a township of Lingshou County in southwestern Hebei province, China, located  northwest of the county seat in the eastern foothills of the Taihang Mountains. , it has 23 villages under its administration.

See also
List of township-level divisions of Hebei

References

Township-level divisions of Hebei